Laeta Kalogridis is an American screenwriter and television and film producer of Greek descent. She has written scripts for Alexander (2004), Night Watch (2004), Pathfinder (2007) and Shutter Island (2010).  She also served as an executive producer for the television series Birds of Prey and Bionic Woman, and she co-wrote the screenplay for Terminator Genisys (2015) and Alita: Battle Angel (2019). She is the creator and executive producer of the Netflix series Altered Carbon (2018).

She is also the founder of the pro-union website Hollywood United and was involved as a peacemaker in the 2007–2008 Writers Guild of America strike.

Early life and education
Laeta Kalogridis  is of Greek descent; her grandparents emigrated from Kalymnos in the early 20th century. She graduated the MFA program for screenwriting at UCLA School of Theater, Film and Television.

Writing career
Early in her career, Kalogridis wrote a spec script about Joan of Arc titled In Nomine Dei.  She sold the script to Warner Bros. in April 1994, but a film was not produced. In March 1995, she was a writer of the early script for the 2000 X-Men film. In late 1999, she did uncredited work on the script for Scream 3.

In September 2000, she was hired to write the screenplay for the 2001 film adaptation of Lara Croft: Tomb Raider. Kalogridis created, executive produced and wrote multiple episodes of the 2002 series Birds of Prey. In September 2003, she was involved in the rewrite of the Wonder Woman live action film adaptation for Warner Bros. Kalogridis wrote a draft of the 2004 film Catwoman but ultimately did not receive a screenwriting credit. She was next credited as the screenwriter of the English language version of the 2004 film Night Watch, and also wrote the script for the 2004 film Alexander.

In January 2005, she worked on a remake of The Lone Ranger for Columbia Pictures. In November 2005, she helped write Borgia, an ImageMovers film about the Borgia family in 15th century Rome. In February 2006 she began writing The Dive, director James Cameron's planned film about the freediver Francisco "Pipin" Ferraras and his wife Audrey Mestre.

In January 2007, she began writing Alita: Battle Angel, director James Cameron's planned film based on the classic cyberpunk manga Battle Angel Alita. In October 2007, she did a rewrite of the vampire film Darksiders for New Line Cinema. She was screenwriter for the 2007 film Pathfinder. She was also the executive producer for the 2007 TV series Bionic Woman, also writing the pilot. For Bionic Woman, she recalls being fired in part because she was told that she "didn't know how to write women," and was replaced by a male writer.

Kalogridis became involved as a peacemaker in the 2007–2008 Writers Guild of America strike, working with writers and producers to reach a solution.  The New York Times reported her involvement, "Ms. Kalogridis  and her friends... had become a pipeline to the guild members holding out for sizable gains, whose support would be needed if any deal was to be reached." She is also the founder of the pro-union website Hollywood United.

She was an executive producer of the 2009 blockbuster Avatar by director James Cameron. She was executive producer and screenwriter of the 2010 film Shutter Island. She produced the 2013 film White House Down. In 2013, she and Patrick Lussier were both named co-writers for the fifth film in the Terminator series, Terminator Genisys.

In 2018, she was producer for the film The House with a Clock in Its Walls.   She was also creator, screenwriter, and executive producer of Altered Carbon, a Netflix scifi series which premiered in February 2018. She continues to work on the film adaptation of the manga Alita: Battle Angel as a co-writer along with James Cameron and Robert Rodriguez, which was released on February 14, 2019. Since 2016 she has also been writing and executive producing the untitled Sword Art Online live-action series for Netflix. She is writing the pilot, noting in an interview that she was working to not "whitewash" the adaptation.

She writes and executive produces the Cleopatra film by Gal Gadot.

In May 2019, BuzzFeed News reported that Laeta Kalogridis had been hired in the spring of 2018 to write a film based on the 2003 video game Star Wars: Knights of the Old Republic, and that she was close to completing the first script of a potential trilogy based on the series. Representatives refused to comment, and nothing has been reported since.

Filmography

Films

Television

References

External links

1965 births
UCLA Film School alumni
University of Texas at Austin alumni
American people of Greek descent
American television writers
Davidson College alumni
Living people
American women television producers
American women screenwriters
American women television writers
People from Winter Haven, Florida
Screenwriters from Florida
American women film producers
Film producers from Florida
Showrunners
21st-century American screenwriters
21st-century American women writers
Television producers from Florida